Oukloof was a small rural community in the Western Cape of South Africa that was forcibly removed from their homes in 1965, and relocated in a nearby location now known as Esterhof.

Location 

The community was located at the southeast edge of Riebeek-Kasteel.

History and context 
One of the earliest available references to the community is from a Dominee (Ds Johannes Stephanus Hauman, a strong supporter of missionary work), who recorded the membership of congregations in Riebeek Kasteel between 1881 and 1907, identifying a Mission Church in Riebeek Kasteel having about 30 'coloured' members. They continued to live and work in the area near the mission church for the next 60 years.

On 23 December 1961, Riebeek Kasteel is declared a white-only group area (Procl. 152 of 1961) that was outlined in the local Swartland newspaper.  On 6 January 1965, the Provincial Administration approved the establishment of a new coloured township on the other side of the railway tracks, that was later named Esterhof. On 1 August 1968, the original land known as Oukloof was transferred from the Village Management Board to the Dutch Reformed Church, for R250.  It is now largely set out as a commercial vineyard.

See also
Forced displacement

References

External links 
 Website for the Oukloof Legacy Project
 The Surplus Peoples Project

Populated places in the Swartland Local Municipality
Forced migration
Former populated places in South Africa
Events associated with apartheid